Baligou Valley, also known as North Water World, is located in Xinxiang City in the Taihang Mountain scenic area in Henan Province, People's Republic of China. In 2006 Baligou Valley was named a National AAAA-class tourist attraction. The site offers eco-tourism, leisure, vacation, entertainment, tourism, and aquaculture in the original natural scenery.

Geography

Scenery
Baligou Valley includes Peach Bay, Mountain Temple, Sheep State, Hongshi River and One-Line Sky, known together as the Five Baligou Valley Scenic Spots.
Baligou Valley has  ancient and original natural scenery with a forest coverage rate of up to 90%, more than 1,700 plant species. The annual average temperature is 14 degrees whilst the  anion content of the atmosphere 5000 per cubic centimeter making it a natural oxygen bar.

References

Valleys of China
Landforms of Henan
Tourist attractions in Henan
AAAA-rated tourist attractions